The Sri Jayendra Swamigal Silver Jubilee Matriculation Higher Secondary School (SJSSJS) is a school in Maharaja Nagar, Tirunelveli, India.  It is named after the Kanchipuram Sri Jayendra Swamigal.

The school follows the CBSE syllabus until class 10 and the Tamil Nadu State Board syllabus for classes 11 and 12.

It is situated near the Roundana bus terminus of Maharaja Nagar.

References

High schools and secondary schools in Tamil Nadu
Education in Tirunelveli
Educational institutions in India with year of establishment missing